Charles Adcock Lamp (3 September 1895 – 17 April 1972) was an Australian politician. Born in Hobart, Tasmania, he was educated at state schools in Queenstown before becoming an apprentice shipwright, blacksmith and railway worker. After serving in the military 1914–1918, he became Tasmanian Secretary of the Australian Railways Union, and Secretary of the Launceston Trades Hall Council and the Tasmanian Labor Party. In 1937 he was elected to the Australian Senate as a Labor Senator for Tasmania. Defeated in 1949, he was later secretary of several unions.

Lamp died in 1972 (aged 76).

References

Australian Labor Party members of the Parliament of Australia
Members of the Australian Senate for Tasmania
Members of the Australian Senate
Australian trade unionists
1895 births
1972 deaths
20th-century Australian politicians
Australian military personnel of World War I